Leather Jacket Love Story is a 1997 film directed by David DeCoteau. The film tells the story of poet Kyle (Sean Tataryn) who wants to find true love with Mike (Christopher Bradley), a handsome, aggressive older man who Kyle met on a one-night stand.  Mink Stole from Hairspray and Serial Mom fame plays Martine, and civil rights activist Morris Kight plays a cameo of himself. It is the first film by DeCoteau which falls outside of speculative fiction genres.

Cast
Sean Tataryn as Kyle
Christopher Bradley as Mike
Geoffrey Moody as Ian
Hector Mercado as Sam
Madame Dish as Madge
Erin Krystle as Charella
Craig Olsen as Amanda
Mink Stole as Martine
Nicholas Worth as Jack
William Butler as Julian
Momma as Waitress
Arlene Golonka as Mom

External links

American LGBT-related films
1997 films
1997 LGBT-related films
Films set in Los Angeles
Films directed by David DeCoteau
1997 drama films
LGBT-related drama films
American drama films
1990s English-language films
1990s American films